Mount Henry is located in the Lewis Range, Glacier National Park in the U.S. state of Montana. Mount Henry is just south of Appistoki Peak in the Two Medicine region of the park.

See also
 Mountains and mountain ranges of Glacier National Park (U.S.)

References

Mountains of Glacier County, Montana
Mountains of Glacier National Park (U.S.)
Lewis Range